Turkish art refers to all works of visual art originating from the geographical area of what is present day Turkey since the arrival of the Turks in the Middle Ages. Turkey also was the home of much significant art produced by earlier cultures, including the Hittites, Ancient Greeks, and Byzantines. Ottoman art is therefore the dominant element of Turkish art before the 20th century, although the Seljuks and other earlier Turks also contributed. The 16th and 17th centuries are generally recognized as the finest period for art in the Ottoman Empire, much of it associated with the huge Imperial court. In particular the long reign of Suleiman the Magnificent from 1520 to 1566 brought a combination, rare in any ruling dynasty, of political and military success with strong encouragement of the arts.

The nakkashane, as the palace workshops are now generally known, were evidently very important and productive, but though there is a fair amount of surviving documentation, much remains unclear about how they operated. They operated over many different media, but apparently not including pottery or textiles, with the craftsmen or artists apparently a mixture of slaves, especially Persians, captured in war (at least in the early periods), trained Turks, and foreign specialists. They were not necessarily physically located in the palace, and may have been able to undertake work for other clients as well as the sultan. Many specialities were passed from father to son.

Seljuk period

Seljuk architecture involves the building traditions of the Seljuk dynasty when it ruled most of the Middle East (Great Seljuk Empire) and Anatolia (Sultanate of Rum) between the 11th and 13th centuries. The Great Seljuk Empire contributed significantly to the architecture of Iran and surrounding regions, introducing innovations such as the symmetrical four-iwan layout and the first widespread creation of state-sponsored learning institutions madrasas. Their buildings were generally constructed in brick, with decoration created using brickwork, tiles, and carved stucco.

Most Anatolian Seljuk works are of dressed stone, with brick reserved for minarets. The use of stone in Anatolia is the biggest difference with the Seljuk buildings in Iran, which are made of bricks. This also resulted in more of their monuments being preserved up to modern times. In their construction of caravanserais, madrasas and mosques, the Anatolian Seljuks translated the Iranian Seljuk architecture of bricks and plaster into the use of stone. 

The architects that the Seljuks built during this period were of great importance in art. Seljuk structures built during the Golden Age of Islam often include geometrical patterns  in their motifs. Seljuks used tiles many times in their art and they painted parts of their social life on ceramics. Generally, they used the khatun and the bey gether in their ceramics. At the same time, many depictions of male and female cavalry were found in Seljuk paintings. They frequently used the color turquoise in their works and today it has gained a unique feature.

Ottoman period

Ottoman architecture developed traditional Islamic styles, with some technical influences from Europe, into a highly sophisticated style, with interiors richly decorated in coloured tiles, seen in palaces, mosques and turbe mausolea.

Other forms of art represented developments of earlier Islamic art, especially those of Persia, but with a distinct Turkish character. As in Persia, Chinese porcelain was avidly collected by the Ottoman court, and represented another important influence, mainly on decoration.  Ottoman miniature and Ottoman illumination cover the figurative and non-figurative elements of the decoration of manuscripts, which tend to be treated as distinct genres, though often united in the same manuscript and page.

The reign of the Ottomans in the 16th and early 17th centuries introduced the Turkish form of Islamic calligraphy. This art form reached the height of its popularity during the reign of Suleiman the Magnificent (1520–66).  As decorative as it was communicative, Diwani was distinguished by the complexity of the line within the letter and the close juxtaposition of the letters within the word. The hilya is an illuminated sheet with Islamic calligraphy of a description of the Islamic prophet Muhammad. The tughra is an elaborately stylized formal signature of the sultan, which like the hilya performed some of the functions of portraits in Christian Europe. Book covers were also elaborately decorated.

Other important media were in the applied or decorative arts rather than figurative work.  Pottery, especially İznik pottery, jewellery, hardstone carvings, Turkish carpets, woven and embroidered silk textiles were all produced to extremely high standards, and carpets in particular were exported widely.  Other Turkish art ranges from metalwork, carved woodwork and furniture with elaborate inlays to traditional Ebru or paper marbling.

18th to 20th centuries
In the 18th and 19th centuries Turkish art and architecture became more heavily influenced by contemporary European styles, leading to over-elaborated and fussy detail in decoration.  European-style painting was slow to be adopted, with Osman Hamdi Bey (1842–1910) for long a somewhat solitary figure. He was a member of the Ottoman administrative elite who trained in Paris, and painted throughout his long career as a senior administrator and curator in Turkey. Many of his works represent the subjects of Orientalism from the inside, as it were.

20th century and onward 
A transition from Islamic artistic traditions under the Ottoman Empire to a more secular, Western orientation has taken place in Turkey. Modern Turkish painters are striving to find their own art forms, free from Western influence. Sculpture is less developed, and public monuments are usually heroic representations of Atatürk and events from the war of independence. Literature is considered the most advanced of contemporary Turkish arts.

Gallery

Architecture

Calligraphy

Ottoman Illumination

Miniature

Painting

Sculpture

Tiles

Handcraft

Fashion

Dance

See also
Ottoman clothing
Culture of the Ottoman Empire
Islamic calligraphy
List of Ottoman calligraphers
History of Modern Turkish painting
Turkish women in fine arts

Notes

References
Levey, Michael; The World of Ottoman Art, 1975, Thames & Hudson, 
Rawson, Jessica, Chinese Ornament: The Lotus and the Dragon, 1984, British Museum Publications, 
Rogers J.M. and Ward R.M.; Süleyman the Magnificent, 1988, British Museum Publications

Further reading

 Binney, Edwin. Turkish Miniature Paintings and Manuscripts, from the Collection of Edwin Binney, 3rd. New York City: Metropolitan Museum of Art; Los Angeles, Calif.: Los Angeles County Museum of Art, 1973. 139 p., amply ill. (in b&w). N.B.: Catalogue of an exhibition held at the named museums. 
 Miller, Lenore D. Echoes of Anatolia: Works of Contemporary Turkish-American Artists ... [catalogue of an] Exhibition [which] Has Been Realized through the Generosity of the Contributing Artists and [of] the Turkish Embassy in Washington, D.C.  [Washington, D.C., c. 1987]. 24 p., amply ill. (in black and white). Without ISBN

 
Art by country
Islamic art by country
Ottoman art
Ottoman culture
Turkish culture

hu:Török művészet